The 2022–23 OFI Crete F.C. season is the club's 98th season in existence and the fifth consecutive season in the top flight of Greek football. In addition to the domestic league, OFI will participate in this season's editions of the Greek Football Cup. The season covers the period from 1 July 2022 to 30 June 2023.

Players

First-team squad

Transfers

In

Out

Pre-season and friendlies

Competitions

Overview

Super League 1

League table

Results summary

Results by round

Matches

Greek Football Cup

Fifth Round

Statistics

Goalscorers

References

External links

OFI Crete F.C. seasons
OFI